Dagestanskaya Pravda (Dagestani Truth) is the main Russian language newspaper of Dagestan.

It received the Order of the Badge of Honour in 1968.

Previous names:
 1918-1920: Дагестанский труженик (Dagestani worker)
 1920-1922: Советский Дагестан (Soviet Dagestan)
 1922-1932: Красный Дагестан (Red Dagestan)

Newspapers published in the Soviet Union
Russian-language newspapers published in Russia
Makhachkala
Newspapers of Dagestan